Lnozavod is a rural locality (a settlement) in Togulsky Selsoviet, Togulsky District, Altai Krai, Russia. The population was 152 as of 2013. There are 3 streets.

Geography 
Lnozavod is located 3 km east of Togul (the district's administrative centre) by road. Togul is the nearest rural locality.

References 

Rural localities in Togulsky District